Grace Church of Kilmarnock, Lancaster County, Virginia is the largest rural Episcopal church in the Commonwealth.

History
The original brick building, the town's first church and now a chapel attached to the current church, was consecrated by assistant bishop John Johns in 1852. At that and some other times, Grace Church shared a single rector with historic Christ Church (founded 1670), St. Mary's Church Whitechapel (founded 1669), and/or Trinity Church in Lancaster.

The current sanctuary was dedicated by Bishop Goodwin in 1959, and an arcade connects it with the old church, now a chapel. In 1988, Bishop Peter James Lee consecrated the enlarged Grace House. Further expansion occurred in 2002.

In 2017, the church building was listed on the National Register of Historic Places.

References

Episcopal churches in Virginia
Churches completed in 1852
Churches in Lancaster County, Virginia
19th-century Episcopal church buildings
1852 establishments in Virginia
National Register of Historic Places in Lancaster County, Virginia